Griesemer is a surname. Notable people with the surname include:

James R. Griesemer, American philosophy academic
John Griesemer (born 1947), American writer, journalist, and actor
Sam Griesemer (born 1984), better known as Samo Sound Boy, American DJ and record producer